The Spice SE88C is a Group C2 sports prototype race car, designed, developed, and built by British manufacturer, Spice Engineering, for sports car racing in the World Sportscar Championship, in 1988.

References

Sports prototypes
Group C cars